Sohrab Mehmed Pasha (1665–67) was an Ottoman official (pasha, and Vizier), the sanjak-bey of the Sanjak of Herzegovina in 1665, and beyler-bey of the Bosnia Eyalet in 1667 (appointed 22 May 1667), during the Cretan War (1645–69).

References

Sources

17th-century people from the Ottoman Empire
Governors of the Ottoman Empire
Sanjak of Herzegovina
Ottoman period in the history of Bosnia and Herzegovina
Cretan War (1645–1669)
Viziers
Pashas